Birol Hikmet (born 24 March 1982) is a Turkish former footballer.

Career
Hikmet currently plays for Adana Demirspor in the defensive midfielder position.

He is more passive when he defends. Rather than tackle a player, he is more likely to shadow him, thus pushing him back. This mentality earns him both praise and criticism.

Despite Hikmet's high pass completion rate, his passing has been described as erratic in the past. A possible explanation for this is his short passing range.

External links
 
  
 

1982 births
Living people
Turkish footballers
Eskişehirspor footballers
Diyarbakırspor footballers
Kardemir Karabükspor footballers
Adana Demirspor footballers
Süper Lig players
People from Akyazı
Association football midfielders